Ajmal Abdul Rahiman known by his stage name Fura is a Dubai-Based Indian rapper, music producer, and singer. Born in Kasaragod, Kerala, India, Fura moved to Dubai when he was two years old. He gained fame through his various live performances and online musical performances and features.

Fura became popular after a feature verse on an R&B cover version of "Tum Hi Ho" which was uploaded on YouTube in May 2013. He is most famous for his singles "Emarat", "Bounce","Pehla Pyar", "This Generation" & "Fcuk You Kony" which was aimed at creating an awareness for Kony 2012 in the United Arab Emirates. Other major features by him include the "Summer Paradise" Cover with Jasim & Alwin and "Whistle" Cover with Jasim.

Career 
Fura started off as an underground independent artist from Dubai, and his work started to gain momentum and exposure during the year 2017 when Hard Kaur featured him on the Title track "All Stars Anthem" with some of India's best underground and mainstream rappers.

After this, his long time collaborator Jasim saw his potential and featured him on the Title track for Abhraminte Santhathikal which features Mammotty in the main role and Gopi Sundar being the Musical Director.

He has also featured a bonus track from the movie Ranam for the track Aydhamedudha which was produced by Jakes Bejoy.

He has also been nominated at the MTV Europe Music Award 2017 for the track "All stars anthem" which won the MTV Europe Music Award for Best Indian Act.

Collaborations

Awards and nominations

References

External links 

 Official Website
 FuRa on Instagram
 FuRa on Twitter
 FuRa on Facebook
 FuRa on Youtube
 FuRa on SoundCloud

Musicians from Dubai
Indian rappers
Indian expatriates in the United Arab Emirates
Living people
Singers from Kerala
Emirati musicians
1991 births
Indian hip hop singers
People from Kasaragod district
Indian male singers